Cortinarius elegans is a species of mushrooms in the family Cortinariaceae.

References

External links 
 
 Cortinarius elegans at Index Fungarum

Fungi described in 1989
elegans